Joseph Li Hongguang (15 July 1926 – 13 December 2006) was a Chinese Catholic priest and bishop of the Prefecture Apostolic of Xinjiang in 2006.

Biography
Li was born in Lucheng County (now Lucheng District, Changzhi), Shanxi, on 15 July 1926. He graduated from Changzhi Seminary, Taiyuan General Seminary, and Beijing Wensheng Seminary. He was ordained a priest on 21 March 1953.

During the Cultural Revolution, Li was imprisoned for 15 years and suffered from pain in his feet because of wearing shackles for a long time. He was released after the Cultural Revolution. Li continued his missionary work and worked as an English teacher in a middle school.

In 1994, he was transferred to the Prefecture Apostolic of Xinjiang as coadjutor bishop. On 14 May 1996, he was elected Bishop of the Prefecture Apostolic of Xinjiang, which was recognized by Pope John Paul II. On 16 July 2006, Bishop Augustin Zheng Shouduo died, and him took over as the vicar of the Prefecture Apostolic of Xinjiang. However, on the afternoon of December 13 of the same year, he died of a heart attack at the age of 80.

References

1926 births
2006 deaths
People from Changzhi
Chinese Roman Catholic bishops